The United Independent Movement is a South African political party founded by Neil de Beer, an international businessman, former Secretary-General of the African Union and former national security advisor to Nelson Mandela.

Formation
The party initially formed as a civil society movement after de Beer had lost faith in the African National Congress (ANC). What was intended to be a simple politically driven movement for the people, soon became so much more to many South Africans. Eventually the movement gained so much momentum and support that people started looking at the UIM as the possible entity that could possibly play a major role in the unsure future of South Africa and bring about much needed change. The call came from the people to form a political party in order to contest elections and possibly represent them in government. On 2 August 2021 the UIM officially registered as political party.

Elections
The party registered for the 2021 South African municipal elections, and contested seven metros and 25 other municipalities Nationally, with de Beer as a candidate for Mayor of Cape Town. The UIM won 3 seats in the 2021 LGE. One seat each in the City of Johannesburg, Ethekwini and the City of Cape Town.

The UIM polled 12th out of 56 parties in the City of Cape Town, 17th out of 97 parties contesting in the Western Cape Province and 26th out of 325 contesting parties Nationally.

Political Beliefs
The UIM has gained a reputation as a party that speaks the harsh truth, calling out those that think they are unreachable or untouchable, as well as a party that cares deeply about the people of this country. A movement that cares enough to get their hands dirty and not only physically fight crime with SAPS over weekends, but help communities in dire need of food and housing.

The UIM's mission is to strengthen a culture of voter accountability by bringing the government closer to the people. Passionate about transforming SA into a hub of excellence and world-class service delivery, the UIM regards itself as a deep investment in SA’s future that puts South Africans first. 

Another objective in its founding manifesto is educating South Africans on their inalienable rights, in the hope that this’ll galvanise them into being active citizens who’ll never allow the abuses and excesses of South Africa’s dark past to come back to haunt the country and its people. This includes settling for nothing less than full and equal access to essential services and amenities, so that all may benefit equitably in SA’s prosperity dividend and quality-of-life index.

Understanding the plight and suffering of ordinary people, the UIM is the only political party - not run by politicians - that guarantees an equal playing field, whereupon ALL South Africans can thrive financially, thus stimulating personal income as well as foreign investment. The current failed leadership of this country is threatening its hard-earned democracy, and has not alleviated, nor eradicated any poverty or inequality, as promised. Nor has it created “a just and equitable economic and social order for the people”, in over 27 years. Since no other party has stepped up to the proverbial plate to loudly oppose the current insurrection, the UIM has committed itself to NOT being the “good men who stay silent” but to be loud, visible and accountable.

The UIM believes that our children are the foundation of our future and need the best quality education that this country can offer which will cultivate a generation of adults, who are securely equipped for the workplace and their career of choice. 

The party and its leadership are engaging with the people on the ground who intimately know and serve their communities, and are in touch with their needs, starting at the grassroots level.

The United Independent Movement believes in dignity, old-fashioned reliability, mutual respect and keeping its promises. Furthermore that the heart of a country is the people and that such heart should be nurtured.

References

2020 establishments in South Africa
Political parties established in 2020
Political parties in South Africa